Prairie Wind is the 26th studio album by Canadian / American musician Neil Young, released on September 27, 2005. After albums rooted in 1960s soul music (Are You Passionate?) and rock opera (Greendale, which spawned a Young-directed film of the same name), Prairie Wind featured an acoustic-based sound reminiscent of his earlier commercially successful albums Harvest and Harvest Moon. The album was in part inspired by the illness and recent death of his father, Canadian sportswriter and novelist Scott Young, and the album is dedicated in part to the elder Young.

Young recorded the album in Nashville before undergoing minimally invasive surgery for an aneurysm in the spring of 2005, and some of the songs on the album appear to be informed by Young confronting his own mortality.

A premiere live performance of Prairie Wind was held in 18–19 August 2005 at the Ryman Auditorium in Nashville. Here, Young held a two-night concert where songs from the album were performed. These concerts became the subject of a film directed by Jonathan Demme entitled Heart of Gold.

Young debuted the album's closing track, "When God Made Me", at the Live 8 concert in Barrie, Ontario, Canada.

Commercial performance
The album debuted on the Billboard 200 album chart at number 11, on October 15, 2005, with sales of approximately 72,000 copies. It remained on the chart for 26 weeks. It was awarded a certified gold record by the RIAA on January 23, 2006. Prairie Wind received two Grammy Award nominations at the 2006 Grammy Awards - Best Rock Album of the Year and Best Rock Solo Performance for "The Painter".

Critical reception 
The record was regarded by Robert Christgau as "one of those nearness-of-death albums", along with Mississippi John Hurt's Last Sessions (1972), Bob Dylan's Time Out of Mind (1997), Warren Zevon's The Wind (2003), and Johnny Cash's American VI: Ain't No Grave (2010).

Track listing
All songs written by Neil Young

Personnel
Neil Young - acoustic guitar, electric guitar, harmonica, piano, vocals
Ben Keith - Dobro, pedal steel, slide guitar
Spooner Oldham - piano, Hammond B3 organ, Wurlitzer electric piano
Rick Rosas - bass
Karl Himmel - drums, percussion
Chad Cromwell - drums, percussion
Grant Boatwright - acoustic guitar (5), backing vocals (1)
Clinton Gregory - fiddle (2)
Wayne Jackson - horns (4, 6, 9)
Thomas McGinley - horns (4, 6, 9)
Emmylou Harris - special guest vocalist (2, 4, 8)
Pegi Young - backing vocals (2-4, 6-7, 9)
Diana Dewitt - backing vocals (2-4, 6-7, 9)
Anthony Crawford - backing vocals (1, 2, 6)
Gary Pigg - backing vocals (2, 9)
Curtis Wright - backing vocals (2)
Chuck Cochran - string arranger
Fisk University Jubilee Choir, directed by Paul Kwami

Production
A Nashville Renaissance Production
Produced by Ben Keith and Neil Young
Analog recording and mixing by Chad Hailey and Rob Clark (2nd engineer)
Recorded at Master-Link Nashville, TN
Analog to Digital Transfers by John Nowland at His Master's Wheels, Woodside, CA
Mastering by Tim Mulligan at Redwood Digital, Redwood City CA

DVD production
Director of photography: L.A. Johnson
Executive Producer: Elliot Rabinowitz
Editor: Toshi Onuki
Post Production at Total Media Group, South San Francisco, CA
DVD menu sound design by Hands on Sound
DVD authoring by: Rich Winter
Art Direction & Design: Gary Burden & Jenice Heo for R. Twerk & Co
Photos of band on CD sleeve and Neil on CD label by L.A Johnson
Photo of "Hank" guitar by Will Mitchell

Charts

Certifications

References

2005 albums
Neil Young albums
Reprise Records albums
Albums produced by Ben Keith
Albums produced by Neil Young
Juno Award for Adult Alternative Album of the Year albums